The Atlanta Crackers were Minor League Baseball teams based in Atlanta, Georgia, between 1901 and 1965. The Crackers were Atlanta's home team until the Atlanta Braves moved from Milwaukee, Wisconsin, in 1966.

History
Atlanta played its first Southern Association game (against the Nashville Baseball Club) on Saturday, April 26, 1902 (Memorial Day) in Piedmont Park before a crowd of around 3,500. For 60 years (until 1961), the Crackers were part of the Class AA Southern Association, a period during which they won more games than any other Association team, earning the nickname the "Yankees of the Minors". In 1962, the Association disbanded. Then, the former Miami Marlins, a Class AAA International League team that had spent 1961 playing in San Juan, Puerto Rico, and Charleston, West Virginia, moved to Atlanta and adopted the Crackers name. 

Originally the top affiliate of the St. Louis Cardinals, the AAA Crackers spent the 1964 season as the Minnesota Twins' top affiliate. Then, in 1965, the Milwaukee Braves became the Crackers' parent club. That team had bought the Crackers as part of their planned move to Atlanta in 1965; under MLB rules of the day, ownership of a minor league team also carried the major league rights to that city. However, an injunction forced the Braves to play a lame-duck season in Milwaukee. The Braves finally moved to Atlanta in 1966, and moved the Crackers to Richmond, Virginia, as the Richmond Braves. In a return home of sorts, the team moved to Gwinnett County, a northeastern suburb of Atlanta, in 2009 as the Gwinnett Braves, now the Gwinnett Stripers. Dating back to their time as the Crackers, the Stripers have been the Braves' top affiliate for 57 seasons, the longest-running affiliation agreement in Triple-A.

The Crackers won the Dixie Series, a postseason interleague championship between the champions of the Southern Association and the Texas League, in 1938 and 1954.

Ballparks
The Crackers played in Ponce de Leon Park from 1907 until a fire on September 9, 1923, destroyed the all-wood stadium. Spiller Field (a stadium later also called Ponce de Leon Park), became their home starting in the 1924 season; it was named in honor of a wealthy businessman who paid for the new concrete-and-steel stadium. That new park was unusual because it was constructed around a magnolia tree that became part of center field. Balls landing in the tree remained in play, until Earl Mann took over the team in 1947 and had the outfield wall moved in about fifty feet. The Crackers played their last season in the newly built Atlanta Stadium (later known as Atlanta–Fulton County Stadium) in 1965.

League affiliations

The Crackers were independent of major league farm systems until 1950. They then became a AA affiliate of the Boston/Milwaukee Braves (1950–1958) and Los Angeles Dodgers (1959–1961) during the last decade of the Southern Association's existence. As an International League team, they were the top affiliate of the St. Louis Cardinals (1962–63), Minnesota Twins (1964) and the Braves again (1965).

Origin of the team's name

According to Tim Darnell, who wrote The Crackers: Early Days of Atlanta Baseball, the origins of the team name is unknown.

Darnell cites several possibilities as to why this name was chosen:
 A term that means a poor, white southerner
 Someone who is quick and efficient at a task
 In reference to plowboys who cracked the whip over animals, as in Georgia cracker
 A shortened version of "Atlanta Firecrackers", the earlier 1892 minor league team

However, this list does not represent the most likely origins of the name. The term cracker is derived from the Gaelic craic, meaning entertaining conversation or boasting, with the latter sense still attested in the idiom "not all it's cracked up to be." It was used in the 18th century to denote Irish and Scottish colonists of the Deep South backcountry. The Earl of Dartmouth had this to say in a 1766 correspondence: "I should explain to your Lordship what is meant by Crackers; a name they have got from being great boasters; they are a lawless set of rascals on the frontiers of Virginia, Maryland, the Carolinas, and Georgia, who often change their places of abode."

During the period of Reconstruction following the American Civil War, there was also a political party of the same name. Organized in Augusta, Georgia, this party's platform was one of "opposition to Catholics and segregation of blacks".

While now sometimes used as a derogatory term for a white southerner that promotes racism, it is also used as a term of pride by some white southerners to indicate one that is descended from those original settlers of the area.

As in several other cities, Atlanta's local Negro league team was named after the local White league team: the Atlanta Black Crackers joined the Negro Southern League in 1920, and existed until the early 1950s.

Notable players

 Luke Appling, a member of the Baseball Hall of Fame who later played for the Chicago White Sox. An Atlanta Braves coach in 1981 and again in 1984.
 Ralph "Country" Brown (1947–1952), member of the 1950 Southern Association championship team, later played for the Chattanooga Lookouts (1952–1957).
 Bruce Barmes, multiple All-Star and League Champion in minor leagues;  uncle of San Diego Padres shortstop Clint Barmes
 Lou Castro
 Leo Cristante, a pitcher who went on to play for the Detroit Tigers and manage baseball teams in both Mexico and Montreal.
 Dick Donovan,  pitched for the Crackers in the 1953 and 1954 seasons.
 Art Fowler, longtime major league pitcher and pitching coach.
 Lloyd Gearhart, who later played with the New York Giants.
 Billy Goodman (1944, 1946), a lifetime major league .300 hitter who won the 1950 American League batting title.
 Dutch Jordan
 Eddie Mathews, an inaugural Atlanta Braves player in 1966 and member of the Baseball Hall of Fame. Also Atlanta Braves Manager 1972–1974.
 Erskine Mayer, starting pitcher
 Tim McCarver, who went on to become a catcher for the St. Louis Cardinals.
 Bob Montag, who hit 113 home runs, the most of any Cracker and the second-most in Association history.
 Ollie O'Mara, shortstop for the Brooklyn Robins and one-time oldest living Brooklyn Dodger.
 Nat Peeples, the only African-American player in the Southern Association (1954).
 Paul Richards, a catcher and later catcher-manager with the Crackers in the 1930s 
 Chuck Tanner, better known as the manager of four different major league teams during the 1970s and 1980s, including the Atlanta Braves from 1986-1988.
 Charley Trippi, former member of the NFL's Chicago Cardinals and a member of the Pro Football Hall of Fame played one season in 1947.

Play-by-play announcer Ernie Harwell called Cracker games on the radio from 1943 to 1949 before being traded to Brooklyn Dodgers for catcher Cliff Dapper, the only time an announcer has been traded for a player.

References

External links

 Atlanta Crackers Photograph Collection from the Atlanta History Center

 
1901 establishments in Georgia (U.S. state)
1965 disestablishments in Georgia (U.S. state)
Boston Braves minor league affiliates
Defunct International League teams
Defunct Southern Association teams
Southern League (1885–1899) teams
Defunct Georgia State League teams
Los Angeles Dodgers minor league affiliates
Milwaukee Braves minor league affiliates
Minnesota Twins minor league affiliates
Baseball teams established in 1901
Sports clubs disestablished in 1965
Sports teams in Atlanta
St. Louis Cardinals minor league affiliates
Southeastern League (1897) teams
Defunct baseball teams in Georgia
Baseball teams disestablished in 1965